The 2009 Kansas City Wizards season was the club's 14th in MLS and the second season played at their temporary home Community America Ballpark. It started on March 21, 2009 with a 3-2 home loss to Toronto FC and ended on October 22, with a 2-2 draw against D.C. United, also at home.

Competitions

Major League Soccer

Standings

Points

Summary 
March
The Wizards broke pre-season camp missing many key components with newly acquired forward Adam Cristman going down with a fifth metatarsal fracture, and defender Chance Myers (1st overall 2008 draft pick) oddly suffering exactly the same injury in the final week of training. Over the first two weeks of the regular season the Wizards would lose the services of seven total players from their normal 18 including the two previously mentioned and; Davy Arnaud, Josh Wolff, Kevin Souter, Eric Kronberg, and Herculez Gomez. These injuries would provide many opportunities for backups. Lance Watson took advantage and found himself playing right back in week 2 @ Colorado and impressed head coach Curt Anolfo enough to secure the spot. Rookie Graham Zusi filled the void out wide in right of midfield and was exposed in the opening loss to Toronto to then rebound in the second match before being sidelined with his own injury, a hamstring strain that would keep him out for all of April. After the disappointing opener the Wizards traveled to Colorado two days behind a blizzard that brought 14 inches of snow to Denver. The two clubs played in cold temperatures in front of a small crowd (at the same time as the USMNT) before the final whistle signaled a 2-1 victory to the Rapids. The Wizards fielded 4 starters in Colorado who had not even seen the field the week before. The lone goal by the Wizards came from seldom used back-up striker Michael Kraus, his first goal in MLS play.

MLS All Time Saves Leader - Kevin Hartman (1,136)

April
April showers brought more bad weather and injuries to the club. Michael Harrington joined Zusi as the most recently injured when he also went down in training with a hamstring strain. The patchwork defense returned home for the first Sunday match of the season featuring rookie and 1st round pick Matt Besler in the back line against a then potent attacking SJ Earthquakes team. For the second week in a row the club faced difficult weather conditions (freezing rain and wind gusts up to 40 MPH). They responded with a better effort, shutting out the Quakes and securing their first win of the season 2-0. Week 4 brought a trip to Seattle to face the undefeated expansion Sounders. The Wizards controlled the first half despite not scoring and saw the Sounders go down a man in the 29th minute when goalkeeper Kasey Keller used his hands outside of the box to deflect a scoring chance from the fast breaking Herculez Gomez. The Wizards couldn't capitalize in the first half and the Sounders looked the better side in the second half until Davy Arnaud launched a game-winning missile from 30 yards out in the 80th minute to deliver the first goal surrendered and first loss to Seattle. The road trip continued onto the Eastern Conference leading Chicago Fire.  The Fire sharply outplayed the relatively sluggish Wizards for the entire first half and most of the second half, with Brian McBride scoring two early goals.  However goalkeeper Kevin Hartman made several spectacular saves to prevent Chicago from any further scoring, and the Wizards were able to muster a comeback late in the second half, with Josh Wolff scoring two goals of his own to equalize the match 2-2. The Wizards welcomed New York to town for the first ever ESPN telecast from Community America Ballpark, Red Bull defender Carlos Johnson took Herculez Gomez down in the box just two minutes into the match and received a red card for denying an obvious goal-scoring opportunity. Neither team played particularly well following the ejection of Johnson but Kansas City got the three points as a result of Claudio López slotting the resulting penalty kick past newly reinstated Jon Conway, who had served the longest performance-enhancing drug suspension ever in Major League Soccer. Jack Jewsbury didn't make the final road trip of April to Toronto as a result of the concussion he suffered just days earlier. The Wizards missed their holding midfielder as TFC played their first match under interim manager Chris Cummins as John Carver stepped down. Toronto was also missing star player Dwayne De Rosario (injured) but Danny Dichio's scramble goal in the 54th minute and TFC's clean sheet was enough to end the Wizards 18 regular season game streak of scoring at least one goal (second longest in the team history). Curt Onalfo's April ended with his family being in a car wreck on the way to the final home game and him personally being fined for comments he made to the officials following the lost in Toronto which he explained was a result of having his passport stolen just days before the trip and having to fly to Colorado to secure a new one in person(The fine was paid for by the club's supporters group as a sign of respect for all he had been through).

Cauldron Man of the Month Award - March & April - Kevin Hartman
MLS Player of the Week - Week 5 - Josh Wolff

May
May began with disappointment as the club once again fell behind an opponent in the first half to only share the points with a second half equalizer. This first occurrence was when resurgent D.C. United visited for a rare Wednesday night match, despite creating many early chances the Wizards faltered and found themselves behind only to see Josh Wolff rescue a point on a play in which he appeared to be offside. The following Saturday the Wizards would aid Columbus in winning their first match and celebrating the Party like it's 1999 promotion that highlighted the tenth season of Columbus Crew Stadium. Wolff would score his fourth goal of the season but it proved too little too late despite the excellent service from Jack Jewsbury. Goalkeeper Kevin El Gato Hartman tallied 7 more saves as the Wizards surprised host Salt Lake handing them their first ever regular season loss in Rio Tinto Stadium. Inspired striker Josh Wolff remained on fire as he netted his fifth and sixth goals of the season pushing the club to their first win in May and second road shutout victory of the season. (Reserves News) The Swope Park Rangers welcomed back Doug DeMartin beating the Kansas City Brass 7-0, this marked a resurgence as goals came from the likes of struggling first teamers Herculez Gomez (2), Michael Kraus (2), and Graham Zusi returning from injury. There had been some hope that Adam Cristman could see the field but instead Kevin Souter and Abe Thompson appeared up top. The club's final home match of May brought in the league leaders Chivas USA on what also happened to be Dog's Night Out at the stadium. The Wizards, to form, didn't get it going until the second half and took the lead on Claudio López's Goal of the Week free kick that beat Zach Thornton. Despite great shot stopping from Kevin Hartman the Wizards gave up the equalizer just minutes later and were forced to defend when Wolff was ejected for an attempted head-butt in the 68th minute, Santiago Hirsig also found himself hitting the showers early as the team played with 9 men for the final 7 minutes. The draw marked the first time in six appearances that Chivas has gotten a single point from their travels to Kansas City. Gregg Berhalter received a sending off after denying Claudio López an obvious goal scoring opportunity in the 59th minute when he held Lopez's jersey for dear life, despite the man advantage it took a rather adventitious miss struck header that was redirected by Arnaud to put the club ahead. Arnaud's 84th-minute goal was the club's 7th scored following the 75th minute of matches and the 13th scored in the second half. Both were league records until Jack Jewsbury gave possession away and Edson Buddle brought The Galaxy even three minutes later for the shared points.

Cauldron Man of the Month Award - May - Josh Wolff
MLS Player of the Week - Week 9 - Josh Wolff
MLS Seirra Mist Goal of the Week - Week 10 - Claudio López
MLS Save of the Week - Week 11 - Kevin Hartman

June
The busy month of June kicked off at home with the defending MLS Cup Champion Columbus Crew sweeping the season series and tie breaker despite playing most of the second half down a man. The Wizards treated the home fans to their best game to date just a week after arguably their worst by defeating the Revs 3-1. Davy Arnaud's streaking run and finish won goal of the week and launched the club into a first half scoring frenzy, when Emmanuel Osei was ejected in the 31st minute it was the fourth consecutive match that the Wizards had played in where either side had been shown a red card. The game marked the beginning of a three-week league break for play in the Superliga and U.S. Open Cup. Superliga kicked off versus F.C. Atlas in St. Louis as the sister clubs played a scoreless draw out in serious heat on father's day, Roger Espinoza was shown a late red card on a questionable challenge in the attacking end. Game two of Group B brought a visit to New England and one more point away from home as the Wizards equalized late with the own goal to draw the Revs 1-1. The club returned home only needing a draw against Santos Laguna to advance to the knockout round however in front of many away supporters Santos iced the tough fought match with a third goal 6 minutes into stoppage time. The match also marked the seventh consecutive competitive match that the Wizards had played where a red card was shown, in that time period the Wizards were shown 4 while their opponents received a shocking 5. On the final day of June the club managed only their second victory since May 16 by beating USL-1 Minnesota Thunder on PK's in the U.S. Open Cup after the Thunder fought back twice to equalize.

Cauldron Man of the Month Award - June - Santiago Hirsig
MLS Seirra Mist Goal of the Week - Week 13 - Davy Arnaud

July
Independence Day saw the club hosting the table leading Houston Dynamo in what would be the latest kickoff time for a home match all season (8:00 PM local). Despite another sell out crowd the team could not score and fell to Houston 1-0. The team would continue to struggle to score goals (missing starters Davy Arnaud (USA), Jimmy Conrad (USA), and Roger Espinoza (HON) who were representing their national teams at the CONCACAF Gold Cup) failing to score in Seattle or New England and being bounced out of the U.S. Open Cup at the same time. With nothing left but the League to focus on the team had two full weeks to prepare for David Beckham and LA Galaxy, The Wizards captured the early lead with Claudio Lopez's amazing Goal of the week winning shot from mid field. Landon Donovan would equalize moments later and the Wizards wouldn't see another point earned for 46 days.

Cauldron Man of the Month Award - July - Kevin Hartman
MLS Seirra Mist Goal of the Week - Week 19 - Claudio López

August
Curt Onalfo found himself out of work following the club's 6-0 loss at Dallas. Technical Director Peter Vermes called his own number and took control of the manager duties after releasing Coach Onalfo but he experienced similar results as the club refused to score a single goal through the month of August. Being out scored 10-0 for the month the Wizards dropped home matches to Chicago and Salt Lake while collecting 8 yellows and 2 straight reds, even with the four losses the Wizards remained in sixth place in the east thanks to an even worse season for New York.

Cauldron Man of the Month Award - August - Lance Watson

September
A visit to friendly Gillette Stadium was all that the club needed to open up the flood gates. The Wizards moved their all-time record at Gillette Stadium to 7-1-5 with the 4-2 victory over New England. The I-95 Road Trip continued down to the nation's capital mid-week where outplayed D.C. United escaped with three points despite KCW controlling much of the match and nearly scoring a handful of goals. New York welcomed the resurgent Wizards to town and gave them an early Josh Wolff goal that the defense held to steal the 1-0 victory while Kevin Hartman registered his first clean sheet in 7 league matches.

Cauldron Man of the Month Award - September -
MLS Player of the Week - Week 25 - Josh Wolff

Results

Superliga

U.S. Open Cup

Statistics

Goalkeepers

Statistics accurate as of match played September 13, 2009
left club during season*
club leader(s) bolded

Squad
As of September 15, 2009.

Transfers

In

Out

References

Sporting Kansas City seasons
Kansas City Wizards
Kansas City Wizards
Kansas City Wizards